Bogucki, feminine: Bogucka, is a Polish-language surname  that can refer to:

Anna Bogucka-Skowrońska,  Polish politician, lawyer, and statesman
Adrian Bogucki
Andrzej Bogucki (1904–1978), Polish stage performer
Jacek Bogucki (born 1959), Polish  politician
Hanna Bogucka (born 1965), Polish telecommunications engineer
Maria Bogucka (born 1929), Polish historian
Robert Bogucki (born 1966), American  firefighter
Teresa Bogucka (born 1945), Polish writer and journalist, opposition activist in Communist Poland

See also
 

Polish-language surnames